The Church of St John the Apostle and Evangelist is a Church of England parish church located in Sutton Road, close to the centre of the busy market town of Watford in Hertfordshire.  It is within the Diocese of St Albans and has throughout its history been one of the leading Anglo-Catholic churches in the southeast of England.  Today it is part of the Richborough Episcopal Area, and lies in the pastoral and sacramental care of the Provincial Episcopal Visitor.

History 
St John's Church, Watford, dates back to 1873.  The ancient parish church of St Mary's was extensively restored in 1871, and during this time a temporary tin church was erected in the churchyard.  With St Mary's re-opened, the tin church was re-erected on some donated ground in Sotheron Road (now Sutton Road).  On 23 November 1873 St John's Church began.

The temporary building, with seating for 450, attracted a growing number of people, and was considered very 'High Church' for its day - many of the things that we associate with catholic worship were yet to come, however. The roof of the Tin Church was unfortunately not waterproof, and it was quickly apparent inside when it was raining outside! The idea of a permanent building was raised, and there followed a period of great activity to raise the necessary money. Many people were most generous - more land was given, plans were drawn up and approved and eventually the foundation stone was laid on 17 July 1891. Two years and two days later, on 19 July 1893, John Wogan Festing, Lord Bishop of St Albans, dedicated the fine building. It cost £11,000 to build - a huge sum in those days. In May 1904 St John's became a parish church in its own right.

The Church was designed by the architect Eley Emlyn White. It has been a Grade II Listed Building since 1983.

Restoration work has been undertaken in the latter half of the twentieth century. The chancel and sanctuary were restored/cleaned in 1961.  The nave and aisles were cleaned and redecorated in memory of the first vicar Canon James who died in 1966. Outside stonework was restored/cleaned in 1973 for the church's centenary.

Interior 

St John's has a fine pipe organ built in 1911 by the London firm of J. W. Walker & Sons Ltd. The rood screen was designed by Sir John Ninian Comper (1864–1960).  Many other gifts of fine plate silver, vestments, copes, stations of the cross, crib figures, statue of The Madonna, glass, and woodwork have been received over the years.

Regular events and services 
The church has an active schedule of services and community events, including:
Services
 Parish Mass (Holy Communion) with Hymns (Every Sunday, 10:30-11;45)
 Holy Communion (Every Friday, 10:00)

Children's services
 Messy Church (First Saturday of the month, 11:00-13:00)
 Breakfast Club and Sunday School (Every Sunday, 09:15-11:45)

Social events
 Community Coffee Morning (Every Wednesday, 10:30-12:30)
 Coffee and Art (Every Friday, 10:30)

St John's Primary School 

The church is working closely with the Department for Education and the Diocese of St Albans to establish a new church Primary School in the parish.  Official approval was granted by the Department for Education in 2014, with the school scheduled to open for its first year's intake in September 2016. More information can be found on the school campaign's Facebook page.

Vicars 
 The Rev. J.H. White – 1873-1898
 The Rt. Rev. John M. Steward - 1898-1904
 The Rev. Canon R.H.L. James -1904-1954
 The Rev. Stanley J. Forrest - 1954-1961
 The Rev. R. Salter - 1962-1998
 The Rev. J. Cope - 1999-2007
 The Rev. E. Lewis - 2008-2010
 The Rev. D.E. Stevenson - 2011–present

References

External links 
 St John’s Church, Watford
 St John's Church on Facebook
 St John's Messy Church on Facebook
 Taizé Prayer in Watford on Facebook
 St John's Primary School on Facebook
 Church of England
 Diocese of St Albans
 Richborough Episcopal Area
 Watford Borough Council
 Hertfordshire County Council

Buildings and structures in Watford
Watford, St John's Church
Grade II listed churches in Hertfordshire
Watford
History of Watford